Marieberg is a residential area in Umeå, Sweden.

External links
Marieberg at Umeå Municipality

Umeå